Sakari Saarinen (born 18 July 1978) is a Finnish former footballer. Saarinen played mostly in midfield, but occasionally also as a defender. In the Finnish premier league Saarinen has played 286 matches and scored 19 goals.

References

External links
Guardian Football

Finnish footballers
Veikkausliiga players
Tampere United players
Rovaniemen Palloseura players
FC Haka players
Footballers from Tampere
1978 births
Living people
Kotkan Työväen Palloilijat players
Association football midfielders